Pir Khwaja Hameeduddin Sialvi (1936 – 17 September 2020) was a Pakistani spiritual leader and politician who was the  sajjadah nasheen of Sial Sharif shrine in Sargodha, Pakistan. His family belongs to اہلسنّت حنفی Barelvi movement.

He was a member of Senate of Pakistan on the ticket of PML (Q) from March 1988 to March 1991 and again from March 1991 to March 1994.

History
He was born in 1936 to a religious family of Sial Sharif and received his early education from Darul-Uloom-Zia-Shamsul-Islam. Later, he started preaching and teaching at Darul-Uloom-Deenia, which he continued for the next two decades.

Death
He died on 17 September 2020. Thousands of his followers attended the funeral prayers.

References

1936 births
2020 deaths
Pakistani religious leaders
Pakistani spiritual teachers
People from Sial Sharif
Members of the Senate of Pakistan
Barelvis
Pakistani Sunni Muslims
Pakistan Muslim League (Q) politicians